Lake Eiði is a lake on the island of Eysturoy in the Faroe Islands.

Lake Eiði is located between the villages of Eiði and Ljósá. The size of the lake was increased by walls 22 and 13 m high, constructed by the SEV company in connection with the Eiði power plant, which uses the lake as a reservoir. Electricity production was started in 1987. Two tunnels redirect water from adjacent valleys to Eiði.

References

External links
Photo of Lake Eiði
Овцы заселили Фарерские острова раньше викингов

Eidi
Eysturoy